Emanuele Bombini (born 2 July 1959 in San Ferdinando di Puglia) is an Italian former cyclist.

Major results

1981
2nd Giro del Lazio
3rd Giro della Romagna
3rd Gran Premio Industria e Commercio di Prato
1982
2nd Giro dell'Umbria
2nd Giro della Romagna
2nd Overall Giro di Sardegna
3rd Giro dell'Emilia
3rd Coppa Placci
1983
2nd Overall Ruota d'Oro
1st Stage 2
2nd Giro dell'Appennino
2nd Gran Premio Industria e Commercio di Prato
3rd Overall Giro del Trentino
1984
2nd Overall Ruota d'Oro
2nd Overall Giro del Trentino
3rd GP Industria & Artigianato di Larciano
1985
1st Milano–Vignola
1st Stages 2 (TTT) & 5 Giro d'Italia
1987
1st Stage 3 Coors Classic
3rd Coppa Agostoni
3rd National Road Race Championships
1988
3rd Overall Giro della Provincia di Reggio Calabria
1989
3rd Coppa Agostoni
1990
3rd Overall Settimana Ciclistica Lombarda
1st Stage 9

References

1959 births
Living people
Italian male cyclists
Sportspeople from the Province of Barletta-Andria-Trani
Cyclists from Apulia